Henricus Gerhard "Hein" Schermers (27 September 1928, Epe, Gelderland – 31 August 2006, Leiden) was a legal scholar in three areas of law: International Institutional Law, the Law of the European Union and European Human Rights Law.  He played a key role in developing these subjects through his writings.  He was Professor of the Law of International Organisations at the University of Amsterdam, and then at the University of Leiden, where he had done his law studies.

Amongst his notable books International Institutional Law and Judicial Remedies in the European Union are classics and have run into numerous editions.  Schermers was a prolific writer of case-books and articles.  Through his writing and teaching he influenced the development of his subjects.

Schermers first was a Legal Advisor at The Netherlands Foreign Ministry, and there began his contacts with international organisations.  The result was the book by which he made his first career, becoming an acknowledged expert in Public International Law with the publication of International Institutional Law.

Schermers then turned his attention to the emerging law of the European Economic Community and published widely in this field.  He became Director of the Europa Instituut at the University of Leiden and Executive Editor of the Common Market Law Review, the leading English-language journal in its field.  He also hosted the annual London-Leiden meetings, a closed invitation-only annual meeting which proved a fertile forum for discussing and developing the law of the European Communities.  The 2007 London-Leiden meeting was dedicated to his memory. Apart from his books, he wrote numerous articles and case-notes.

Schermers was appointed a member of the European Commission for Human Rights and developed what might be described as his third career (carried out in parallel with his other two), developing into one of the leading practitioners and scholars of European Human Rights law.  Again he wrote prolifically in this area.

Schermers received honorary degrees, decorations from The Netherlands and Belgium, and countless academic honours, including being appointed a Corresponding Fellow of the British Academy.  He was the subject of a massive three-volume Festschrift.  He remained untouched by these distinctions: he was completely devoid of arrogance or pretension and was a role model for virtually all with whom he came into contact.  He was a superb teacher, and took infinite trouble with his students, and was legendary in his care for them.

Having retired from his Chair in Leiden, Schermers was appointed to a special Chair in order to continue his link with the University.  His final farewell lecture was attended by the leaders of Dutch academia and policy-makers, many of whom had been his colleagues or students.

Schermers was a scholar of genuine intellectual independence: at the time when all leading Dutch international law scholars without exception signed a document urging sanctions against South Africa and suggested that they were indeed required under public international law, he was the lone dissenter (on purely technical grounds) and in a highly controversial move, made his views public.  His views were attacked, but his intellectual honesty was respected.

1928 births
2006 deaths
People from Epe, Netherlands
20th-century Dutch lawyers
Leiden University alumni
Academic staff of the University of Amsterdam
Academic staff of Leiden University
Corresponding Fellows of the British Academy